The RotorSport Calidus is a German tandem two-seater autogyro modified in the UK to meet British Civil Airworthiness Requirements CAP643 Section T. The Calidus is an enclosed-cockpit development of the open-cockpit RotorSport UK MT-03. New-build AutoGyro Calidus aircraft are imported from the manufacturers, AutoGyro GmbH in Hildeshem, Germany and completed to British regulations by RotorSport UK Ltd.

Design and development
The Calidus is powered by a  Rotax 912 ULS, although optionally a  Rotax 914 UL Turbo can be fitted. Fuel capacity is either 39 litres in a single tank or 74 litres in two tanks. The Calidus has an aerodynamic fuselage pod, giving 20 knots higher maximum speed than the MT-03. While the open-cockpit MT-03 (which continues in production) is promoted as a "motorbike in the skies", the Calidus is aimed at a different market. The Calidus' fully enclosed cockpit protects the occupants from exposure to inclement weather, while the aircraft's higher cruise speed makes it more suitable for long-distance touring.

The panel can be equipped with conventional instruments and/or a "glass panel" according to certification requirements and the buyer's needs. For the UK RotorSport version, either a fixed-pitch propeller or a ground-adjustable propeller may be fitted; but in Germany the unmodified AutoGyro Calidus has either a ground-adjustable propeller or an inflight-adjustable controllable-pitch propeller.

The Calidus has a take off distance of 10 to 70 metres and lands in 15 metres, or can land vertically in some circumstances. An optional heater makes cold-weather flying feasible; but although navigation lights may be fitted, night flying is not permitted. The payload is 230 kg for versions with the Rotax 912, so even with a full fuel load of 54 kg, two crew of up to 88 kg each can be accommodated.

Specifications (Rotax 912 variant)

See also

References

2000s British civil utility aircraft
AutoGyro GmbH aircraft
Single-engined pusher autogyros